Gabriel Cotabiță (born 1 November 1955, Craiova) is a Romanian rock vocalist. In 2002 he joined a group of rock musicians and together they formed the band VH2, of which Gabriel is a vocalist. He was also a host of a Callatis Festival and also a prominent part of a Romanian mainstream rock scene. He has had a few notable collaborations with artists such as Ștefan Bănică, Jr. and Loredana Groza.

References

1955 births
Living people
People from Craiova
Romanian musicians